The 15th Central Committee of the Chinese Communist Party was in session from 1997 to 2002. The 14th Central Committee preceded it. It was followed by the 16th Central Committee of the Chinese Communist Party. This was the first Central Committee that current Chinese Paramount Leader Xi Jinping was elected to, as an alternative member. 

It elected the 15th Politburo of the Chinese Communist Party in 1997. Plenary sessions were held by the politburo.

Members
In stroke order of surnames:

Brief chronology
1st Plenary Session
Date: September 19, 1997
Location: Beijing
Significance: Jiang Zemin was re-appointed General Secretary of the Chinese Communist Party and Chairman of the Central Military Commission. A 24-members Politburo, a 7-members Politburo Standing Committee and a 7-members Secretariat were elected.
2nd Plenary Session
Date: February 25–26, 1998
Location: Beijing
Significance: The meeting approved lists of nominees for top posts of the 9th National People's Congress and the 9th National Committee of the Chinese People's Political Consultative Conference and a proposal for reforming the State Council.
3rd Plenary Session
Date: October 12–14, 1998
Location: Beijing
Significance: The meeting reviewed the previous 20 years of economic reform and set the goal to establish new rural towns according to socialism with Chinese characteristics by 2010.
4th Plenary Session
Date: September 19–22, 1999
Location: Beijing
Significance: The reform of the State-owned enterprises was launched aiming at establishing a "modern enterprise system". Hu Jintao was appointed vice-chairman of the Central Military Commission.
5th Plenary Session
Date: October 9–11, 2000
Location: Beijing
Significance: Premier Zhu Rongji delivered a report on the guidelines for 10th Five-Year Plan, proclaiming modernization, opening up and technological progress as its basic goals. The meeting also decided upon China's accession to the World Trade Organization and urged the Party to apply Jiang Zemin's Three Represents, exposed by the Party General Secretary in February of the same year.
6th Plenary Session
Date: September 24–26, 2001
Location: Beijing
Significance: The meeting celebrated the 80th anniversary of the establishment of the CCP, with General Secretary Jiang Zeming speaking about it, and adopted a Decision of the CCP Central Committee to Strengthen and Improve the Party's Work Style based on the Three Represents, allowing capitalists to join the Party.
7th Plenary Session
Date: November 3–5, 2002
Location: Beijing
Significance: Preparations for the Party's 16th National Congress were made. The meeting proclaimed Deng Xiaoping Theory and the Three Represents as the guideline for China "in the new century and new stage of reform and opening up and socialist modernization".

External links
 15th Central Committee of the CCP, People's Daily Online.

Central Committee of the Chinese Communist Party
1997 establishments in China
2002 disestablishments in China